Bolton is an unincorporated community in Montgomery County, Kansas, United States.

History
Bolton was laid out in 1886 when the railroad was extended to that point.

Geography

References

Further reading

External links
 Montgomery County maps: Current, Historic, KDOT

Unincorporated communities in Montgomery County, Kansas
Unincorporated communities in Kansas